Statistics of Superettan in season 2002.

Overview
It was contested by 16 teams, and Östers IF won the championship.

League table

Season statistics

Top scorers

Top assists

Footnotes

References
Sweden - List of final tables (Clas Glenning)

Superettan seasons
2
Sweden
Sweden